The 1948 Bulgarian Cup Final was the 8th final of the Bulgarian Cup (in this period the tournament was named Cup of the Soviet Army), and was contested between Lokomotiv Sofia and Slavia-Chengelov on 9 May 1948 at Yunak Stadium in Sofia. Lokomotiv won the final 1–0.

Match

Details

See also
1948 Bulgarian Republic Football Championship

References

Bulgarian Cup finals
Cup Final